Children of the Revolution is a 2010 documentary by Irish filmmaker Shane O'Sullivan about Ulrike Meinhof and Fusako Shigenobu, leaders of the German Red Army Faction and the Japanese Red Army.

Inspired by the student revolutions of 1968 and appalled by the killing in Vietnam, Meinhof and Shigenobu set out to destroy capitalist power through world revolution. They travelled to the Middle East to train with Palestinian militants and, alongside Leila Khaled, became the leading female revolutionaries of their time.

Authors and journalists Bettina Röhl and Mei Shigenobu explore the lives of their mothers, Ulrike and Fusako, providing a unique perspective on two of the most notorious freedom fighters in contemporary history. On the run or kidnapped when their mothers went underground, Mei and Bettina emerged from difficult childhoods to lead their own extraordinary lives. They reflect on their mothers' actions as the film asks: what were they fighting for and what have we learned.

Shot in Tokyo, Beirut, Jordan and Germany, the film tells the stories of Meinhof and Shigenobu through the eyes of Mei and Bettina, using rare archive footage of student protests and guerilla training camps in Germany, Japan and the Middle East.

The film premiered at the International Documentary Film Festival Amsterdam in November 2010 and has screened at several international festivals. It had its broadcast premiere on German channel Westdeutscher Rundfunk on 30 May 2011 and was released on DVD in the United Kingdom in 2011. It was pitched at the 2009 Sheffield Doc/Fest MeetMarket.

References

External links
 
 

2010 films
British documentary films
Irish documentary films
Documentary films about people convicted on terrorism charges
2010 documentary films
Red Army Faction
English-language Irish films
2010s English-language films
2010s British films